The 1927 Westbury by-election was a by-election held on 16 June 1927 for the British House of Commons constituency of Westbury.

Vacancy
The Unionist MP, Walter William Shaw died on 10 May 1927 at the age of 58. He had been MP here since the last General election, when he gained the seat from the Liberal;

History
In the 13 elections since the constituency was created in 1885, the Unionists had won only three times to the Liberals ten times. The Labour Party first contested the seat in 1918 and then at every election since. In every one of the four elections since 1918, the winner was elected with a minority of the vote, with Labour finishing third every time. So the constituency could be described as a Unionist/Liberal marginal.

Candidates
The Unionists chose Maj. Eric Long to defend the seat. He was the 35-year-old son of former Unionist leader  Walter Long. 
The previous Liberal MP, Charles Darbishire who was the Liberal candidate last time, had died in 1925. The local Liberals had not got around to selecting a replacement until the by-election occurred. They settled on 34-year-old Harcourt Johnstone, a former Liberal MP for Willesden East who had been defeated at the last General Election. Johnstone was related to former Liberal leader William Harcourt. Johnstone first tried to re-enter parliament at the 1925 Eastbourne by-election but finished second in this safe Unionist seat. 
The Labour candidate was George Ward, who had contested the seat at the previous three elections, never polling more than a fifth of the vote. He was a local Justice of the Peace and worked as a railway signalman.

Result

Aftermath
All three candidates again faced each other at the following General Election, with a similar result;

Johnstone was eventually to return to the house in 1931 as Liberal MP for South Shields.

External links
Portrait of Harcourt Johnstone 
 http://www.npg.org.uk/collections/search/portraitLarge/mw146294/Harcourt-Johnstone?LinkID=mp76753&search=sas&sText=Harcourt+Johnstone&OConly=true&role=sit&rNo=1

References

1927 elections in the United Kingdom
By-elections to the Parliament of the United Kingdom in Wiltshire constituencies
1927 in England
20th century in Wiltshire